Salmonberries is a 1991 German drama film directed by Percy Adlon and written by Adlon and his son Felix Adlon. It stars k.d. lang as Kotzebue, an orphaned Eskimo and young woman of androgynous appearance who works as a (male) miner in Alaska, and Rosel Zech as Roswitha, an East German exiled and widowed librarian. The film takes place in Kotzebue, Alaska and Berlin, Germany, shortly after reunification; the dialog is mostly English but includes some German with English subtitles.

Their ambiguous relationship seems to be on the edge of lesbian love.

The films title takes its name from the endless jars of preserved berries that line the walls of Roswitha's bedroom.

Singer k.d. lang, who performs an evocative ballad, "Barefoot," in the film, it was co-written by k.d. lang and Bob Telson.

After Miss lang had asked Adlon to direct a music video for her, ("So in Love" for the AIDS-benefit Red Hot + Blue compilation album) he wrote the script of "Salmonberries" especially for her.

Cast
 Oscar Kawagley as Butch
 Rosel Zech as Roswitha
 k.d. lang as Kotzebue
 Eugene Omiak as Gvy
 Wayne Waterman as Ronnie
 Jane Lind as Noayak
 Chuck Connors as Bingo Chuck
 Alvira H. Downey as Izzy
 Wolfgang Steinberg as Albert
 Christel Merian as Albert's wife
 George Barril as Bingo attendant
 Gary Albers as Tight rope walker

Awards
Salmonberries has won several awards:
 Grand Prix des Amériques (Best Film), Montreal World Film Festival
 Best Actress, Rosel Zech, Bavarian Film Awards
 Best Production, Eleonore Adlon, Bavarian Film Awards

Critical reception
Janet Maslin, in her 1994 review of the film for The New York Times, called it a "halting, awkward effort" with "stilted direction" and "sharp camera angles, arty editing". It has "uneasy acting debut" by k.d lang, but Rosel Zech has a "warmth and naturalness".

Kevin Thomas of the L.A. Times in 1994, said the film was "endearing, remarkably assured and stunning-looking" and with "the utmost sensitivity, Adlon raises crucial questions of cultural and sexual identity".

It was reviewed by Timeout Magazine and NF stated that it was "slight, quirky but often moving film" and "real praise goes to the two stars for breathing so much human warmth into some chilly scenes of winter".

On Rotten Tomatoes, it has a score of 71% based on 7 reviews, with a weighted average of 6.21/10.

References

External links
 
 

1991 films
1991 drama films
1990s English-language films
English-language German films
German independent films
Lesbian-related films
German LGBT-related films
Films directed by Percy Adlon
Films set in Alaska
Films shot in Alaska
1991 LGBT-related films
1991 independent films
1990s German films